Wahnfried is a 1986 West German-French drama film directed by Peter Patzak about the life of Richard Wagner. It was screened out of competition at the 1987 Cannes Film Festival.

Cast
 Otto Sander as Richard Wagner
  as Cosima Wagner
  as Judith Mendès-Gauthier
 Peter Matić as Hans von Bülow
 Anton Diffring as Franz Liszt
 Christoph Waltz as Friedrich Nietzsche
 Anja Jaenicke as Daniela von Bülow
 Luise Prasser as Malwida von Meysenbug
  as Carrie Pringle
  as Catulle Mendès
 Rudolf Wessely as Schnappauf
 Annette Richter as Blandine von Bülow
 Isabelle Weggler as Isolde von Bülow
 Beate Finckh as Elisabeth Nietzsche

References

External links

1986 films
1980s biographical films
German biographical films
French biographical films
West German films
1980s German-language films
1980s French-language films
Films directed by Peter Patzak
Cultural depictions of Richard Wagner
Cultural depictions of Friedrich Nietzsche
Films about classical music and musicians
Films about composers
Films set in the 19th century
1986 multilingual films
French multilingual films
German multilingual films
1980s French films
1980s German films